Christian Wilhelm Ahlwardt (23 November 1760 in Greifswald – 12 April 1830 in Greifswald) was a German classical philologist. He was the father of orientalist Wilhelm Ahlwardt (1828–1909).

After obtaining his habilitation from the University of Rostock, he worked as a schoolteacher in the town of Demmin (from 1792). In 1795 he was named academic rector in Anklam, followed by a rectorship at the Oldenburg gymnasium (from 1797). In 1811 he was named rector of the gymnasium in Greifswald, and in 1817 he became a professor of ancient literature at the University of Greifswald, where he remained until his death.

Principal works 
 Zur Erklärung der Idyllen Theokrits, 1792 – Explanation of the Idylls of Theocritus.
 Kallimachos Hymnen und Epigrammen, 1794 – Callimachus' hymns and epistles.
 Lodovico Ariosto's Satyren, 1794 – Lodovico Ariosto's "Satyren".
 Der Attis des Catullus, 1808 – The Attis by Catullus.
 Die Gedichte Ossians, 1811 – The poetry of Ossian.             
 Pindari Carmina, cvm fragmentis, 1820 – an edition of Pindar.

References 

1760 births
1830 deaths
People from Greifswald
Academic staff of the University of Greifswald
German classical philologists